The Lakeshore Canadiens are a Canadian junior ice hockey team based in Belle River, Ontario.  They play in the Provincial Junior Hockey League of the Ontario Hockey Association and Hockey Canada.  The Canadiens are 5 time Clarence Schmalz Cup Winners as Provincial Junior C Champions and the defending champions.  The team was known as the Belle River Canadiens from 1978 until 2014.

History

From 1985 until 2001, the Canadiens were one of the most feared teams in all of Ontario Junior "C" hockey.  Within those 17 years, the Canadiens won 11 GLJHL Championships and 4 Clarence Schmalz Cups as All-Ontario Junior "C" Champions in 8 trips to the All-Ontario Finals. After 9 years The Canadiens once again won the Great Lakes Junior "C" Title in 2010 defeating the Wallaceburg Lakers in 4 Games.  In the Schmalz Cup Semi-Finals they defeated the Grimsby Peach Kings 4 Games to 1 to advance to their first Ontario Final in 9 Years. The Canadiens then Lost the Schmalz Cup in 6 Games to the Alliston Hornets. In 2011 The Canadiens won their 2nd Consecutive Great Lakes title.  They once again faced the Grimsby Peach Kings in the Ontario Semi Finals. Grimsby would win the series 4 games to 1.

The Belle River Canadiens have won 14 Great Lakes Junior C League Championships, they are 2nd to the Essex 73's who have won 18. Essex and Belle River have also won the most Ontario Championships, Essex with 6, and the Canadiens with 4.

On June 6, 2014, the team announced it was changing its name to the Lakeshore Canadiens.

The Canadiens moved into the brand new Atlas Tube Centre in the fall of 2014. In their first game at the new Atlas Tube Centre Sebastian Kanally scored the first ever goal 38 seconds into the game as the Canadiens defeated their rivals from Essex by a score of 3–1. The Canadiens would finish 24–13–0–3 in their first full season in their new rink.

The summer of 2016 saw the GLJHL become the Bill Stobbs Division of the new Provincial Junior Hockey League, which resulted from the amalgamation of the eight junior "C" hockey leagues in Southern Ontario.

In 2017-2018 long time General Manager Mark Seguin hired Anthony Iaquinta as Head Coach, under Iaquinta the Canadiens finished First Place in the Stobbs division finishing with a record of 27-8-2-3, the Canadiens would sweep the Blenheim Blades and Mooretown Flags in the first 2 rounds, they would face their rivals from Essex in the division finals.  In front of 3 straight sell out crowds on home ice the Canadiens would knock off the 73's in 5 games to claim their 14th League Championship.

2018-2019 would be another successful season for the Canadiens, finishing with a regular season record of 28-7-2-3 good enough for 2nd place in the Stobbs Division.  In the playoffs the Habs would eliminate the Wheatley Sharks in 4 games, in the semi Finals they would face a very good Dresden Kings team.  The Canadiens would defeat the Kings in 6 games in a hard fought series setting up a rematch with the Essex 73's for a third straight season.  The result would be the same as the previous season, the Canadiens once again defeating the 73's in 5 games in front of huge crowds at the Atlas Tube Centre to claim their 2nd straight Stobbs title and 15th League Championship in total.  The Exeter Hawks would defeat the Canadiens in 7 games in the All Ontario playoffs.

The 2019-2020 season would be one of the most successful seasons in Canadiens history as the Canadiens finished with a record of 36 wins and 4 losses.  The Canadiens were headed to the Stobbs Finals after knocking the Essex 73's in the semi finals and set to face the Mooretown Flags however covid would shut down the remainder of the season and cancel the 2020-2021 season.

The Canadiens returned to the ice in 2021-2022 after a year off due to the covid.  Once again the Canadiens would finish in first place with a 28-2-2 record in the regular season.  The Canadiens swept the Wallaceburg Thunderhawks in round one.  In the semi finals the Canadiens were pushed to six hard fought games against the wheatley Sharks to set up a finals matchup with the Essex 73's.  For the forth consecutive season the Canadiens got the best of the 73's and defeated them in six games.  Trevor LaRue would score the league championship winning goal in Game 6 overtime as the Canadiens won their 16th league title.  The Canadiens would move on to defeat the North Middlesex Stars in the Western Conference Finals in four close games.  Next up was the Schmalz Cup tournament where the Canadiens would go 2 wins and 1 loss in the round robin to set up a semi finals matchup with the Grimsby Peach Kings.  The Canadiens came away with a 5-0 victory to set up a showdown with the Clarington Eagles in the finals.  In a instant classic Dylan Weston would score 41 seconds into overtime to give the Canadiens a 3-2 victory to become Schmalz Cup Champions for the 5th time in team history and the first time since 1995.

2021-2022 Team Staff

General Manager - Mark Seguin
Head coach - Anthony Iaquinta 
Assistant coach - Mike Dobric
Assistant coach - Ron Soucie
Assistant coach-Jack Bowler
Trainer- Laine Parent
Equipment Manager - Ryan Arsenault

Season-by-season record

Clarence Schmalz Cup appearances
1985: Belle River Canadiens defeated Midland Centennials 4-games-to-1
1990: Orangeville Crushers defeated Belle River Canadiens 4-games-to-3
1992: Belle River Canadiens defeated Stayner Siskins 4-games-to-2
1994: Belle River Canadiens defeated Rockton Real McCoys 4-games-to-none
1995: Belle River Canadiens defeated Bowmanville Eagles 4-games-to-none
1997: Glanbrook Rangers defeated Belle River Canadiens 4-games-to-2
2000: Lakefield Chiefs defeated Belle River Canadiens 4-games-to-2
2001: Chippawa Riverhawks defeated Belle River Canadiens 4-games-to-1
2010: Alliston Hornets defeated Belle River Canadiens 4-games-to-2
2022: Lakeshore Canadiens defeated Clarington Eagles 3-2 OT in final

Championship Playoffs 2022 
Clarence Schmalz Cup Championships

External links

Canadiens Webpage

Notable alumni
Bob Boughner
Tie Domi
Mike Natyshak
Brad Smith
D. J. Smith
Alek Stojanov
Derek Wilkinson	
Steve Ott

Great Lakes Junior C Hockey League teams
1978 establishments in Ontario
Ice hockey clubs established in 1978